Atle Selberg (14 June 1917 – 6 August 2007) was a Norwegian mathematician known for his work in analytic number theory and the theory of automorphic forms, and in particular for bringing them into relation with spectral theory. He was awarded the Fields Medal in 1950 and an honorary Abel Prize in 2002.

Early years 
Selberg was born in Langesund, Norway, the son of teacher Anna Kristina Selberg and mathematician Ole Michael Ludvigsen Selberg. Two of his three brothers, Sigmund and Henrik, were also mathematicians.  His other brother, Arne, was a professor of engineering. 

While he was still at school he was influenced by the work of Srinivasa Ramanujan and he found an exact analytical formula for the partition function as suggested by the works of Ramanujan; however, this result was first published by Hans Rademacher.

He studied at the University of Oslo and completed his PhD in 1943.

World War II
During World War II, Selberg worked in isolation due to the German occupation of Norway. After the war, his accomplishments became known, including a proof that a positive proportion of the zeros of the Riemann zeta function lie on the line .

During the war, he fought against the German invasion of Norway, and was imprisoned several times.

Post-war in Norway
After the war, he turned to sieve theory, a previously neglected topic which Selberg's work brought into prominence. In a 1947 paper he introduced the Selberg sieve, a method well adapted in particular to providing auxiliary upper bounds, and which contributed to Chen's theorem, among other important results.

In 1948 Selberg submitted two papers in Annals of Mathematics in which he proved by elementary means the theorems for primes in arithmetic progression and the density of primes. This challenged the widely held view of his time that certain theorems are only obtainable with the advanced methods of complex analysis. Both results were based on his work on the asymptotic formula

where

for primes . He established this result by elementary means in March 1948, and by July of that year, Selberg and Paul Erdős each obtained elementary proofs of the prime number theorem, both using the asymptotic formula above as a starting point. Circumstances leading up to the proofs, as well as publication disagreements, led to a bitter dispute between the two mathematicians.

For his fundamental accomplishments during the 1940s, Selberg received the 1950 Fields Medal.

Institute for Advanced Study 
Selberg moved to the United States and worked as an associate professor at Syracuse University and later settled at the Institute for Advanced Study in Princeton, New Jersey in the 1950s, where he remained until his death. During the 1950s he worked on introducing spectral theory into number theory, culminating in his development of the Selberg trace formula, the most famous and influential of his results. In its simplest form, this establishes a duality between the lengths of closed geodesics on a compact Riemann surface and the eigenvalues of the Laplacian, which is analogous to the duality between the prime numbers and the zeros of the zeta function.

He was awarded the 1986 Wolf Prize in Mathematics. He was also awarded an honorary Abel Prize in 2002, its founding year, before the awarding of the regular prizes began.

Selberg received many distinctions for his work, in addition to the Fields Medal, the Wolf Prize and the Gunnerus Medal. He was elected to the Norwegian Academy of Science and Letters, the Royal Danish Academy of Sciences and Letters and the American Academy of Arts and Sciences.

In 1972, he was awarded an honorary degree, doctor philos. honoris causa, at the Norwegian Institute of Technology, later part of Norwegian University of Science and Technology.

His first wife, Hedvig, died in 1995. With her, Selberg had two children: Ingrid Selberg (married to playwright Mustapha Matura) and Lars Selberg. In 2003 Atle Selberg married Betty Frances ("Mickey") Compton (born in 1929). 

He died at home in Princeton, New Jersey on 6 August 2007 of heart failure.

Selected publications 
 Atle Selberg Collected Papers: 1 (Springer-Verlag, Heidelberg),

References

Further reading
 Albers, Donald J. and Alexanderson, Gerald L. (2011), Fascinating Mathematical People: interviews and memoirs, "Atle Selberg", pp 254–73, Princeton University Press, .
  Interview with Selberg

External links

 
 
 Atle Selberg archive webpage
 Obituary at Institute for Advanced Study
 Obituary in The Times
 Atle Selbergs private archive exists at NTNU University Library

1917 births
2007 deaths
20th-century American mathematicians
21st-century American mathematicians
Fields Medalists
Institute for Advanced Study faculty
Members of the Royal Danish Academy of Sciences and Letters
Members of the Norwegian Academy of Science and Letters
Norwegian emigrants to the United States
Norwegian mathematicians
Number theorists
People from Bamble
University of Oslo alumni
Wolf Prize in Mathematics laureates
Members of the Royal Swedish Academy of Sciences